M 1507 Teutonia was a German fishing trawler that was requisitioned by the Kriegsmarine in the Second World War for use as an auxiliary minesweeper. Built as Teutonia, she served as M 1507 Teutonia, the vorpostenboot V 204 Teutonia and M 4628 Teutonia. She became the French fishing trawler Rouget post-war and was scrapped in 1961.

Description
The engine was built by Howaldtswerke AG, Kiel, Germany. It was rated at 121nhp.

History
Teutonia was built as yard number 736 by Howaldtswerke, Hamburg, Germany for N. Ebsling, Bremerhaven. She was launched on 17 June 1937 and completed on 23 July. The fishing boat registration BX 258 was allocated, as were the Code Letters DOSP.

On 28 September 1939, Teutonia was requisitioned by the Kriegsmarine for use as an auxiliary minesweeper. She was allocated to 15 Minensuchflotille as M 1507. On 15 April 1940, she was escorting the steamships ,  and  along with the minesweepers M 1501 Gauleiter Burkel, M 1502 Wien, M 1503 Holstein, M 1505 Tirol, M 1506 Ostfriesland, M 1503 Kurmark, the submarine chaser  and two R boats when the convoy was attacked off the Oslofjord by the submarine . A torpedo fired at Bahia Castillo narrowly missed the ship. In March 1943, 15 Minensuchflotille was disbanded. On 29 April 1943, She was allocated to 2 Vorpostenflotille, becoming the vorpostenboot V 214 Teutonia. On 1 December 1944, she was transferred to 46 Minensuchflotille as M 4628 Teutonia.

Post war, she was seized by France, becoming the merchant fishing trawler Rouget in 1948. She was owned by P. Le Garrec, Marseille, Bouches-du-Rhône. The Code Letters FPUD were allocated. By 1960, she had been sold to Armament Guille Frères, Boulogne, Pas-de-Calais. Her Code Letters were then FOQR. She was scrapped in 1961.

References

Sources

1937 ships
Ships built in Hamburg
Fishing vessels of Germany
Steamships of Germany
Minesweepers of the Kriegsmarine
Auxiliary ships of the Kriegsmarine
Steamships of France
Merchant ships of France